Caress of the Sphinx (also known as Art) is an 1896 painting by the Belgian Symbolist artist Fernand Khnopff (1858–1921) famed for its depiction of androgyny. The work is an interpretation of the French symbolist painter Gustave Moreau's 1864 painting Oedipus and the Sphinx.

It is pointed out in the book Enchanting David Bowie that the album cover artwork by Guy Peellaert for the rock star's 1974 album Diamond Dogs possesses striking similarities to the painting.

The painting plays an important part in the plot of the short story "The Caress" from the book "Axiomatic" of Greg Egan.

The painting is in the permanent collection of the Royal Museum of Fine Arts of Belgium in Brussels.

References

1896
Belgian paintings
Symbolism (arts)
1896 in art